The year 1750 in architecture involved some significant events.

Events

 November 18 – Westminster Bridge across the River Thames in London, designed by Swiss-born engineer Charles Labelye, is officially opened.
 Kedleston Hall in Derbyshire, England, is commissioned by Sir Nathaniel Curzon (later 1st Baron Scarsdale), to be designed by James Paine and Matthew Brettingham.
 Calcot Park, Berkshire, England, is rebuilt by John Blagrave, following a fire.
 William Halfpenny publishes Rural Architecture in the Chinese Taste in England.

Buildings and structures

Buildings
 Azm Palace, Damascus
 Christoffel Vought Farmstead, New Jersey
 Preservation Hall, a private residence in the New Orleans French Quarter (it will serve as a tavern during the War of 1812)
 Fort Rensellear in Canajoharie, New York

Births
 January 21 – François Baillairgé, architect, painter and sculptor (died 1830)
 May 20 – William Thornton, British-American physician, inventor, painter and architect (died 1828)
 date unknown – John Booth, architect and surveyor (died 1843)
 probable – Thomas Baldwin, English surveyor and architect in Bath (died 1820)

Deaths
 September 5 – Lauritz de Thurah, Danish architect and architectural writer (born 1706)

References